Roseacres is an unincorporated community in Coahoma County, Mississippi, United States.

The settlement was first called "Mound Place", and then "Priddy", before being renamed Roseacres.

History
In 1844, James L. Alcorn established a cotton plantation here called "Mound Place".  He also opened a law office in nearby Friars Point.  Alcorn would later become Governor of Mississippi.

Mound Place had a post office from 1854-71.

The Yazoo Pass Expedition sent Union gunboats into Yazoo Pass, which flowed next to Mound Place, in an attempt to follow a circuitous route of waterways down to Vicksburg. Union forces progressed as far as Greenwood, where a Confederate steamer was scuttled to block their progress. During the weeks when Union ships were passing Mound Place, first on their advance and then on their retreat, Mound Place was used as a temporary camp by Union soldiers. It was reported that the soldiers slaughtered Alcorn's cattle to feed their troops, rolled his carriages into Yazoo Pass, and destroyed his fences.

The Mobile and Northwestern Railroad was laid in the 1870s, and a station was established at Mound Placed called "Priddy".  The line was abandoned in 1983.

An outbreak of smallpox occurred at Roseacres in 1882, with 20 cases noted and five deaths.

The United States Nursery Company purchased the plantation in 1910, and the settlement was renamed "Roseacres". The company ceased operations in 1924.

The Roseacres post office existed from 1910-24.

Gallery

References

Unincorporated communities in Coahoma County, Mississippi
Unincorporated communities in Mississippi